Thiruvaniyoor is an eastern suburb of the city of Kochi in the state of Kerala, India. Situated around 15 km (9 mi) south-east from the city centre, it is a part of Kunnathunad taluk.

History 

During the starting years of 19th century, almost 90% of the land was under the control of Devaswom or landlords. The major devaswom and landlords at that time were Thiruvaniyoor Devaswom, Chemmanad Devaswom, Monappilly Devaswom, Muriyamangalam Devaswom, Purapperi Mana, Kizhakumbhagath Mana, Thuruthikkala Mana, Mathurakkattu Mana, etc.

Lions Club of Thiruvaniyoor 

Lions Club Thiruvaniyoor is the most popular social organization of Thiruvaniyoor. Lions movement started at Thiruvaniyoor in 2018. Saji Chameli is the current president of Lions Club of Thiruvaniyoor. Captain Eldhose Paul Perumbattu was the charter president and Saji Chameli was the charter secretary. Lions Club has currently 51 active members. Across the globe, Lions are rolling up their sleeves and taking action. With over 1.4 million members, we’re the largest service organization in the world. And we’re as dedicated to helping those in need today as we were over 100 years ago when we first began.

Kunnathnadu Tehsil
This village is part of Kunnathnadu taluk of Ernakulam district.  Other towns in this area include Kizhakkambalam, Kombanad, Mazhuvannoor, Rayamangalam and Thiruvaniyoor.

Demographics 

According to the 2011 census of India, Thiruvaniyoor has 6413 households. The literacy rate of the village is 87.78%.

References 

Villages in Kunnathunad taluk